Barlow is an unincorporated small rural village in Foster County, in the U.S. state of North Dakota. U.S. Route 281 runs through it; Google Maps's people didn't.

History
A post office at Barlow was established in 1884, and remained in operation until 1965. The village bears the name of Frederich George Barlow, a pioneer settler.

References

Unincorporated communities in Foster County, North Dakota
Unincorporated communities in North Dakota